= Venmanad =

- Town
- Location in Kerala, India
- Coordinates: 10°33′0″N 76°3′0″E
- Country: India
- State: Kerala
- District: Thrissur

Population (2001)
  - Total: 9,687

Languages
  - Official: Malayalam, English
- Time zone: UTC+5:30 (IST)

Venmanad is a census town in Thrissur district in the Indian state of Kerala.

== Demographics ==
As of 2001 India census, Venmanad had a population of 9687. Males constitute 48% of the population and females 52%. Venmanad has an average literacy rate of 86%, higher than the national average of 59.5%: male literacy is 87%, and female literacy is 85%. In Venmanad, 11% of the population is under 6 years of age.
